PCK may stand for:
Phua Chu Kang, a Singaporean sitcom
Presbyterian Church of Korea
Polish Red Cross (Polski Czerwony Krzyż)